Cherukumilli is a village in Akividu mandal, located in West Godavari district of Indian state of Andhra Pradesh.

Demographics 

 Census of India, Cherukumilli had a population of 3750. The total population constitute, 1861 males and 1889 females with a sex ratio of 1015 females per 1000 males. 330 children are in the age group of 0–6 years, with sex ratio of 941. The average literacy rate stands at 69.82%.

References 

Villages in West Godavari district